Bald Hills is the northernmost suburb in the City of Brisbane, Queensland, Australia. In the  Bald Hills had a population of 6,502 people.

Geography

Bald Hills is a largely residential suburb. It is mostly surrounded by bushland, but in the last few years some of the bush areas have been cleared to make way for new residential areas.  It also borders onto the Bald Hills Flats – a large flood plain on the western side of the suburb that is used for cattle grazing.  The South Pine River flows through the flood plain and forms the western border of the suburb.  The South Pine River converges with the North Pine River and the combined flow, Pine River, forms the northern border.  Along the banks of Pine River within Bald Hills is a large environmental park called the Tinchi Tamba Wetlands Reserve.  The Pine River empties into Bramble Bay, between Redcliffe and Brighton.

History
Bald Hills is situated in the Yugarabul traditional Aboriginal country.

The suburb is named after the two small hills in the South Pine River Valley floor.

The first land sales in the area occurred in 1857. Land sales around the Bald Hills railway station were advertised in April 1886. At the time the journey from Brisbane was described as "after travelling across the Downfall and Cabbage Tree Creeks, the traveller arrives at a long stretch of road, at the extremity of which rises a lofty knoll, round the brow of which the road winds, when the Bald Hills are reached".

In 1888, the "Bald Hills Railway Station Estate" made up of 500 allotments was advertised to be auctioned by Arthur Martin & Co., auctioneers. A map advertising the auction indicates that the land is situated near Bald Hills railway station and special trains will be provided on the day of the sale.

Bald Hills State School began enrolling students on 30 April 1866 with the first school building opened on 24 September 1866.

St Paul's School opened on 31 January 1961.

In 2016, the median age of the Bald Hills population was 36 years of age, 2 years below the Australian median of 38.  76.7% of people living in Bald Hills were born in Australia, compared to the national average of 66.7%; the next most common countries of birth were New Zealand 4%, England 3.4%, Philippines 1.8%, India 1.7%, Fiji 0.7%.  88.8% of people spoke only English at home; the next most popular languages were 0.9% Tagalog, 0.6% Punjabi, 0.6% Spanish, 0.5% Telugu, 0.5% Hindi. The most common ancestry backgrounds of at least one of the parents for Bald Hills residents were English 27.5%, Australian 26.9%, Irish 7.9%, Scottish 7.7% and German 4.5%. The median weekly incomes for residents of Bald Hills aged 15 years and over was reported to be $725 which was higher than the Australian and Queensland personal incomes (at $662 and $660 respectively). This wealthier-than-average income was reflected in a higher-tha- average household income for residents of this suburb. In Bald Hills, median household income was $1,584, compared to $1,438 in Australia and $1,402 in Queensland.

Heritage listings
Bald Hills has a number of heritage-listed sites, including:
 99 Kluver Street: Bald Hills Radiator
 34 Strathpine Road: Hoop Pines
 56 Strathpine Road: Bald Hills Presbyterian Church

Education
Bald Hills State School is a government primary (Prep-6) school for boys and girls at 2156 Gympie Road. In 2018, the school had an enrolment of 621 students with 42 teachers (38 full-time equivalent) and 29 non-teaching staff (17 full-time equivalent). It includes a special education program.

St Paul's Anglican School is a private primary and secondary (Prep-12) school for boys and girls at 34 Strathpine Road. In 2018, the school had an enrolment of 1206 students with 96 teachers (90 full-time equivalent) and 73 non-teaching staff (64 full-time equivalent).

There is no government secondary school in Bald Hills. The nearest government secondary schools are Bracken Ridge State High School in neighbouring Bracken Ridge to the east, Pine Rivers State High School in neighbouring Strathpine to the north-west, and Aspley State High School in Aspley to the south.

Facilities 
Bald Hills is home to the breeding and training centre for Guide Dogs for the Blind Association of Queensland.

Amenities 
Bald Hills is the home of the Bald Hills-Lawnton Lions Cricket Club, as well as Ridge Hills United Football Club.

Bald Hills Uniting Church is at 2131 Gympie Road.

Due to proximity to North Pine River, Bald Hills has a large number of green and open spaces. Parks include, but not limited to:
 Tinchi Tamba Wetlands Reserve (also known as Deepwater Bend Reserve, Pine River Wetlands)
 St Martin Court Park with Shared pathway and water (bubbler/tap)
 Harold Kielly Park with a picnic area and shelter
 John Stewart Memorial Park with Picnic area/shelter with electric barbecue, playground, rebound wall and water (bubbler/tap) 
 Harold Kielly Park with Picnic area/shelter with electric barbecue, playground and shared pathway
 Chris Brunton Park (previously known as Hoyland Street Park (no. 6)) with Outdoor fitness/exercise circuit, picnic area/shelter and water (bubbler/tap)
 Canterbury Park with Designated drone launching area, barbecue (electric), bikeway, dog off-leash area, outdoor fitness/exercise trail, basketball/netball facility (basketball half court), picnic area/shelter (Rush Worth Street), playground (Rush Worth Street), water (bubbler/tap/dog bowl), wetlands (Feuerriegel Road) and cricket field
 Barungwarra Bushland Reserve (South Pine Pocket Reserve) with Boat ramp (Pine River), dog off-leash area and vehicle access

Transport
Bald Hills railway station provides access to regular Queensland Rail City network services to Brisbane and Springfield Central, as well as Kippa-Ring. There are also many buses serving the area.  The suburb is crossed by both Gympie Road and the northern end of the Gateway Motorway.  The southern end of the Bruce Highway is located here as well.

Brisbane City Council runs a Personalised Public Transport (PPT) service in Bald Hills. Personalised Public Transport (PPT) is a low-cost hail and ride service that helps connect residents to their local transport hubs. This service runs Monday to Friday, except public holidays. Maximum journey time one-way is 15 minutes.

There are over 50 Translink bus stops around Bald Hills that provide a number of regular bus services with connections running to Brisbane CBD, Redcliffe and beyond.

References

Further reading

External links

 
 
 

 

 
Suburbs of the City of Brisbane
1857 establishments in Australia
Populated places established in 1857